Dino Dvornik is the eponymous debut album by Croatian singer Dino Dvornik. Released in 1989, the album is a mix of funk and pop rock. The album sold over 750,000 copies.

Background 
Dvornik debuted at 1988 Zagrebfest with song Tebi pripadam. Biggest hits are Lady, Zašto praviš slona od mene, Ljubav se zove imenom tvojim and Ti si mi u mislima.

Track listing
All music by Dino Dvornik.  All lyrics by Goran Kralj, except where noted.

Personnel
Dino Dvornik - percussion, drum machine, vocals, occasional keyboards
Silvije Skare - lead guitar
Dragan Lukic - synthesizer, brass, keyboards occasional percussion
Mladen Baucic - tenor saxophone
Sinisa Kovacevic - alto saxophone
Goran Kralj - bass drum, snare drum
Zeljko Sapmajer - brass, synthesizers
Tilly and Neno Belan - vocals, backing vocals

Additional personnel
 unknown musicians - bass, vocals

References

1989 debut albums
Dino Dvornik albums
Jugoton albums